Café Barbera is an Italian coffeehouse and fast casual dining franchise registered with the International Franchise Association (IFA) since 2015. It operates franchises in Europe, the Middle East, Africa, Asia and South America. The first Cafè Barbera opened in 2004 in Dubai and is named after the first Café Barbera founded by Domenico Barbera in 1870 in Southern Italy. It is considered one of the oldest companies in Europe and is still managed by the Barbera family.

Business concept 

Domenico Barbera established his coffee roasting business, named Caffé Barbera, in 1870 in Southern Italy,. Being one of the five oldest coffee companies in Europe,  the franchise company Café Barbera opened its first corporate coffeehouse in Dubai in 2004. The first franchisee location opened in Dubai in 2009.

Franchise operations
Café Barbera became a member of the International Franchise Association in 2015. It has locations in Europe, South America, UAE, UK, Egypt, Ghana, Iraq, Kuwait, Bahrain, Morocco, Jordan, Ukraine, Pakistan, Sudan and Somalia. The company opened its first UAE coffee house location in Dubai in 2004 and had eight stores by 2015. In 2013, the first Brazilian franchised Café Barbera opened. There were multiple locations in Brazil by the end of 2015. The company also opened its first coffee shops in Sudan in 2013. The first Iraqi Café Barbera opened in 2014 and by the end of 2015 there were four coffee houses in Iraq. Café Barbera entered Pakistan in 2018 with four locations in the country. Between 2016 and 2019 stores were opened in Middle East, UK and Somalia, Jordan, UAE and the United Kingdom. In 2019, Forbes Middle East featured the Cafe Barbera concept in the March issue. Café Barbera has extensive growth plans in 2020 onward, with new stores opening in the UK, Egypt, Ghana, Morocco, UAE, Iraq, Bahrain & Djibouti.

See also 
 List of coffeehouse chains

References

External links 
 

Fast casual restaurants
Food and drink companies established in 1870
Restaurants established in 2004
Coffeehouses and cafés in the United States
1870 establishments in Italy
2004 establishments in Florida